Kalkun may refer to
Kalkun Cay, United States Virgin Islands, an islet in the United States

People
Andreas Kalkun (born 1977), Estonian poet, musician and folklorist
Gustav Kalkun (1898–1972), Estonian discus thrower
Karl Kalkun (1927–1990), Estonian actor
Mari Kalkun (born 1986), Estonian singer and musician 

Estonian-language surnames